Ringo Starr & His All Starr Band Live 2006 is a 2008 live album by rock supergroup Ringo Starr & His All-Starr Band. It was recorded during his 2006 All-Starr Tour in Uncasville, Connecticut.

In addition to Starr, his co-stars are Richard Marx, Billy Squier, Edgar Winter, Rod Argent, Hamish Stuart, and Sheila E.

This particular All-Starr tour was notable for Starr's personal and professional break with longtime collaborator, Mark Hudson, who declined to participate, inciting the split.

Track listing
"Introduction"
 ''Includes versions of "With a Little Help from My Friends" (Lennon–McCartney) and "It Don't Come Easy" (Richard Starkey)
"What Goes On" (Lennon–McCartney–Starkey)
"Honey Don't" (Carl Perkins)
"Everybody Wants You" (Billy Squier)
"Free Ride" (Daniel Earl Hartman)
"A Love Bizarre" (Prince–Sheila Escovedo)
"Don't Mean Nothing" (Richard Marx–Bruce Gaitsch)
"She's Not There" (Rod Argent)
"Yellow Submarine" (Lennon–McCartney)
"Frankenstein" (Edgar Winter)
"Photograph" (Richard Starkey–George Harrison)
"Should've Known Better" (Richard Marx)
"The Glamorous Life" (Prince)
"I Wanna Be Your Man" (Lennon–McCartney)
"Rock Me Tonite" (Billy Squier)
"Hold Your Head Up" (Rod Argent–Chris White)
"Act Naturally" (Johnny Russell–Voni Morrison)
"With a Little Help from My Friends" (Lennon–McCartney)

Personnel 

 Ringo Starr – drums, vocals, executive producer
 Sheila E – drums, vocals
 Billy Squier – guitar, vocals
 Richard Marx – guitar, vocals
 Edgar Winter – keyboards, saxophone, vocals
 Rod Argent – keyboards, vocals
 Hamish Stuart – bass, vocals

References

Richard Marx albums
Billy Squier albums
Sheila E. albums
2008 live albums
Ringo Starr live albums
Albums produced by Ringo Starr